Maria Yolanda Caroline Gertrude "Marjolein" Bolhuis-Eijsvogel (born 16 June 1961) is a retired Dutch field hockey forward, who won a gold medal at the 1984 Summer Olympics and a bronze at the 1988 Games. From 1980 to 1988 she played 123 international matches for the Netherlands, in which she scored 56 goals.

Bolhuis-Eijsvogel is a daughter of sports journalist Hans Eijsvogel. She is married to hockey coach Peter Bolhuis, a brother of former hockey player and president of the Dutch Olympic Committee André Bolhuis.

References

External links
 

1961 births
Living people
Dutch female field hockey players
Olympic field hockey players of the Netherlands
Field hockey players at the 1984 Summer Olympics
Field hockey players at the 1988 Summer Olympics
Olympic gold medalists for the Netherlands
Olympic bronze medalists for the Netherlands
Sportspeople from Haarlem
Olympic medalists in field hockey
Medalists at the 1988 Summer Olympics
Medalists at the 1984 Summer Olympics
Amsterdamsche Hockey & Bandy Club players
20th-century Dutch women
21st-century Dutch women